The 1822 Maine gubernatorial election took place on September 9, 1822. Incumbent Democratic-Republican Governor Albion Parris won re-election to a second term.

Results

References

Gubernatorial
1822
Maine
September 1822 events